Marcelo Longobardi (born March 21, 1961) is an Argentine journalist.

Biography
Marcelo Longobardi established the magazine "Apertura" in 1982. He worked in several radios from 1986 to 2000: Radio El Mundo, Radio del Plata, Radio Libertad and Radio America. In 2000 he began the radio program "Cada mañana" in Radio 10, leading the radio audiences. The program was moved in 2012 to Radio Mitre.

Awards
 2013 Martín Fierro Awards
 Best male radio host

References

External links

 Official site 

Argentine journalists
Male journalists
Argentine radio presenters
Argentine magazine founders
People from Buenos Aires
Living people
1961 births